Masterkraft may refer to:

Masterkraft (producer), a record producer
MSTRKRFT, a Canadian electronic music group